Mohamed Riad Louafi (born October 23, 1987, Hussein Dey) is an amateur Algerian freestyle wrestler, who competes in the men's light heavyweight category (84 kg). Louafi represented Algeria at the 2012 Summer Olympics in London, where he competed for the men's 84 kg class. He received a bye for the preliminary round of sixteen, before losing out to Belarus' Soslan Gattsiev, with a two-set technical score (0–2, 3–4), and a classification point score of 1–3.

References

External links
Profile – International Wrestling Database
NBC Olympics Profile

Algerian male sport wrestlers
1987 births
Living people
Olympic wrestlers of Algeria
Wrestlers at the 2012 Summer Olympics
People from Hussein Dey (commune)
21st-century Algerian people
20th-century Algerian people